In mathematics, a sheaf is a tool for systematically tracking data (such as sets, abelian groups, rings) attached to the open sets of a topological space and defined locally with regard to them. For example, for each open set, the data could be the ring of continuous functions defined on that open set. Such data is well behaved in that it can be restricted to smaller open sets, and also the data assigned to an open set is equivalent to all collections of compatible data assigned to collections of smaller open sets covering the original open set (intuitively, every piece of data is the sum of its parts).

The field of mathematics that studies sheaves is called sheaf theory.

Sheaves are understood conceptually as general and abstract objects. Their correct definition is rather technical. They are specifically defined as sheaves of sets or as sheaves of rings, for example, depending on the type of data assigned to the open sets.

There are also maps (or morphisms) from one sheaf to another; sheaves (of a specific type, such as sheaves of abelian groups) with their morphisms on a fixed topological space form a category. On the other hand, to each continuous map there is associated both a direct image functor, taking sheaves and their morphisms on the domain to sheaves and morphisms on the codomain, and an inverse image functor operating in the opposite direction. These functors, and certain variants of them, are essential parts of sheaf theory.

Due to their general nature and versatility, sheaves have several applications in topology and especially in algebraic and differential geometry. First, geometric structures such as that of a differentiable manifold or a scheme can be expressed in terms of a sheaf of rings on the space. In such contexts, several geometric constructions such as vector bundles or divisors are naturally specified in terms of sheaves. Second, sheaves provide the framework for a very general cohomology theory, which encompasses also the "usual" topological cohomology theories such as singular cohomology. Especially in algebraic geometry and the theory of complex manifolds, sheaf cohomology provides a powerful link between topological and geometric properties of spaces. Sheaves also provide the basis for the theory of D-modules, which provide applications to the theory of differential equations. In addition, generalisations of sheaves to more general settings than topological spaces, such as Grothendieck topology, have provided applications to mathematical logic and to number theory.

Definitions and examples 

In many mathematical branches, several structures defined on a topological space  (e.g., a differentiable manifold) can be naturally localised or restricted to open subsets : typical examples include continuous real-valued or complex-valued functions, -times differentiable (real-valued or complex-valued) functions, bounded real-valued functions, vector fields, and sections of any vector bundle on the space. The ability to restrict data to smaller open subsets gives rise to the concept of presheaves. Roughly speaking, sheaves are then those presheaves, where local data can be glued to global data.

Presheaves 

Let  be a topological space. A presheaf of sets  on  consists of the following data:
This set is also denoted .
For each inclusion of open sets , a function . In view of many of the examples below, the morphisms  are called restriction morphisms. If , then its restriction  is often denoted  by analogy with restriction of functions.
The restriction morphisms are required to satisfy two additional (functorial) properties:
If we have three open sets , then the composite 
Informally, the second axiom says it doesn't matter whether we restrict to W in one step or restrict first to V, then to W. A concise functorial reformulation of this definition is given further below.

The two presheaf axioms are immediately checked, thereby giving an example of a presheaf. This can be extended to a sheaf of holomorphic functions  and a sheaf of smooth functions .

Sheaves 
A sheaf is a presheaf that satisfies both of the following two additional axioms:
If  for all , then .
If all pairs of sections agree on the overlap of their domains, that is, if  for all , then there exists a section  such that  for all .

The section  whose existence is guaranteed by axiom 2 is called the gluing, concatenation, or collation of the sections si. By axiom 1 it is unique. Sections  and  satisfying the agreement precondition of axiom 2 are often called compatible; thus axioms 1 and 2 together state that any collection of pairwise compatible sections can be uniquely glued together. A separated presheaf, or monopresheaf, is a presheaf satisfying axiom 1.

The presheaf consisting of continuous functions mentioned above is a sheaf. By contrast, the constant presheaf is usually not a sheaf as it fails to satisfy the locality axiom on the empty set (this is explained in more detail at constant sheaf).

Presheaves and sheaves are typically denoted by capital letters,  being particularly common, presumably for the French word for sheaf, faisceau.

It can be shown that to specify a sheaf, it is enough to specify its restriction to the open sets of a basis for the topology of the underlying space. Moreover, it can also be shown that it is enough to verify the sheaf axioms above relative to the open sets of a covering. This observation is used to construct another example which is crucial in algebraic geometry, namely quasi-coherent sheaves. The open sets  form a basis for the Zariski topology on this space.

There is another characterization of sheaves that is equivalent to the previously discussed.
This characterization is useful in construction of sheaves, for example, if  are abelian sheaves, then the kernel of sheaves morphism  is a sheaf, since projective limits commutes with projective limits. On the other hand, without consider any examples, the cokernel is not always a sheaf because inductive limit not necessarily commutes with projective limits. One of the way to fix this is to consider Noetherian topological spaces; every open sets are compact so that the cokernel is a sheaf, since finite projective limits commutes with inductive limits.

Further examples

Sheaf of sections of a continuous map 

This construction is especially important when  is the projection of a fiber bundle onto its base space. For example, the sheaves of smooth functions are the sheaves of sections of the trivial bundle. Another example: the sheaf of sections of

Given a point  and an abelian group , the skyscraper sheaf  is defined as follows: if  is an open set containing , then . If  does not contain , then , the trivial group.

Sheaves on manifolds 
On an -dimensional -manifold , there are a number of important sheaves, such as the sheaf of -times continuously differentiable functions  (with ). Its sections on some open  are the -functions . For , this sheaf is called the structure sheaf and is denoted . The nonzero  functions also form a sheaf, denoted . Differential forms (of degree ) also form a sheaf . In all these examples, the restriction morphisms are given by restricting functions or forms.

Instead, this forms a cosheaf, a dual concept where the restriction maps go in the opposite direction than with sheaves. However, taking the dual of these vector spaces does give a sheaf, the sheaf of distributions.

Presheaves that are not sheaves 
In addition to the constant presheaf mentioned above, which is usually not a sheaf, there are further examples of presheaves that are not sheaves:
 Let  be the two-point topological space  with the discrete topology.
This is not a sheaf because it is not always possible to glue. For example, let  be the set of all  such that . The identity function  is bounded on each . However, these sections do not glue, because the function  is not bounded on the real line. Consequently  is a presheaf, but not a sheaf. In fact,  is separated because it is a sub-presheaf of the sheaf of continuous functions.

Motivating sheaves from complex analytic spaces and algebraic geometry 
One of the historical motivations for sheaves have come from studying complex manifolds, complex analytic geometry, and scheme theory from algebraic geometry. This is because in all of the previous cases, we consider a topological space  together with a structure sheaf  giving it the structure of a complex manifold, complex analytic space, or scheme. This perspective of equipping a topological space with a sheaf is essential to the theory of locally ringed spaces (see below).

Technical challenges with complex manifolds 
One of the main historical motivations for introducing sheaves was constructing a device which keeps track of holomorphic functions on complex manifolds. For example, on a compact complex manifold  (like complex projective space or the vanishing locus of a homogeneous polynomial), the only holomorphic functionsare the constant functions. This means there could exist two compact complex manifolds  which are not isomorphic, but nevertheless their ring of global holomorphic functions, denoted , are isomorphic. Note that sometimes this sheaf is denoted  or just , or even  when we want to emphasize the space the structure sheaf is associated to.

Tracking submanifolds with sheaves 
Another common example of sheaves can be constructed by considering a complex submanifold . This kind of formalism was found to be extremely powerful and motivates a lot of homological algebra such as sheaf cohomology since an intersection theory can be built using these kinds of sheaves from the Serre intersection formula.

Operations with sheaves

Morphisms 
Morphisms of sheaves are, roughly speaking, analogous to functions between them. In contrast to a function between sets, which have no additional structure, morphisms of sheaves are those functions which preserve the structure inherent in the sheaves. This idea is made precise in the following definition.

In other words, for every open subset  of an open set , the following diagram is commutative.

For example, taking the derivative gives a morphism of sheaves on :

With this notion of morphism, sheaves on a fixed topological space  form a category. The general categorical notions of mono-, epi- and isomorphisms can therefore be applied to sheaves. A sheaf morphism  is an isomorphism (resp. monomorphism) if and only if each  is a bijection (resp. injective map). Moreover, a morphism of sheaves  is an isomorphism if and only if there exists an open cover  such that  are isomorphisms of sheaves for all . This statement, which also holds for monomorphisms, but does not hold for presheaves, is another instance of the idea that sheaves are of a local nature.

The corresponding statements do not hold for epimorphisms (of sheaves), and their failure is measured by sheaf cohomology.

Stalks of a sheaf 

The stalk  of a sheaf  captures the properties of a sheaf "around" a point , generalizing the germs of functions.
Here, "around" means that, conceptually speaking, one looks at smaller and smaller neighborhoods of the point. Of course, no single neighborhood will be small enough, which requires considering a limit of some sort. More precisely, the stalk is defined by

the direct limit being over all open subsets of  containing the given point .

This generalises the usual definition of a germ.

In many situations, knowing the stalks of a sheaf is enough to control the sheaf itself. For example, whether or not a morphism of sheaves is a monomorphism, epimorphism, or isomorphism can be tested on the stalks. In this sense, a sheaf is determined by its stalks, which are a local data. By contrast, the global information present in a sheaf, i.e., the global sections, i.e., the sections  on the whole space , typically carry less information. For example, for a compact complex manifold , the global sections of the sheaf of holomorphic functions are just , since any holomorphic function

is constant by Liouville's theorem.

Turning a presheaf into a sheaf 
It is frequently useful to take the data contained in a presheaf and to express it as a sheaf. It turns out that there is a best possible way to do this. It takes a presheaf  and produces a new sheaf  called the sheafification or sheaf associated to the presheaf . For example, the sheafification of the constant presheaf (see above) is called the constant sheaf. Despite its name, its sections are locally constant functions.

Another construction of the sheaf  proceeds by means of a functor  from presheaves to presheaves that gradually improves the properties of a presheaf: for any presheaf ,  is a separated presheaf, and for any separated presheaf ,  is a sheaf.

In this way, the category of sheaves turns into a Giraud subcategory of presheaves. This categorical situation is the reason why the sheafification functor appears in constructing cokernels of sheaf morphisms or tensor products of sheaves, but not for kernels, say.

Subsheaves, quotient sheaves 
If  is a subsheaf of a sheaf  of abelian groups, then the quotient sheaf  is the sheaf associated to the presheaf ; in other words, the quotient sheaf fits into an exact sequence of sheaves of abelian groups;

(this is also called a sheaf extension.)

Let  be sheaves of abelian groups.

All of these operations extend to sheaves of modules over a sheaf of rings ; the above is the special case when  is the constant sheaf .

Basic functoriality 

Since the data of a (pre-)sheaf depends on the open subsets of the base space, sheaves on different topological spaces are unrelated to each other in the sense that there are no morphisms between them.

Direct image

This construction recovers the skyscraper sheaf  mentioned above:
 

For a map between locally compact spaces, the direct image with compact support is a subsheaf of the direct image. If  is proper itself, then , but in general they disagree.

Inverse image
One a wide range of topological spaces , such sheaves are equivalent to representations of the fundamental group .

The stalk is an essential special case of the pullback in view of a natural identification, where  is as above:

More generally, stalks satisfy .

Extension by zero
 if  and  otherwise.

Complements

Sheaves in more general categories
In addition to (pre-)sheaves as introduced above, where  is merely a set, it is in many cases important to keep track of additional structure on these sections. For example, the sections of the sheaf of continuous functions naturally form a real vector space, and restriction is a linear map between these vector spaces.

Morphisms in this category of functors, also known as natural transformations, are the same as the morphisms defined above, as can be seen by unraveling the definitions.

If the target category  admits all limits, a -valued presheaf is a sheaf if the following diagram is an equalizer for every open cover
 of any open set :

Here the first map is the product of the restriction maps

and the pair of arrows the products of the two sets of restrictions

and

If  is an abelian category, this condition can also be rephrased by requiring that there is an exact sequence

A particular case of this sheaf condition occurs for  being the empty set, and the index set  also being empty.

Ringed spaces and sheaves of modules 

Such a pair  is called a ringed space. Many types of spaces can be defined as certain types of ringed spaces. Commonly, all the stalks  of the structure sheaf are local rings, in which case the pair is called a locally ringed space.
 
Similarly, schemes, the foundational notion of spaces in algebraic geometry, are locally ringed spaces that are locally isomorphic to the spectrum of a ring.

Most important geometric objects are sheaves of modules. For example, there is a one-to-one correspondence between vector bundles and locally free sheaves of -modules. This paradigm applies to real vector bundles, complex vector bundles, or vector bundles in algebraic geometry (where  consists of smooth functions, holomorphic functions, or regular functions, respectively). Sheaves of solutions to differential equations are -modules, that is, modules over the sheaf of differential operators. On any topological space, modules over the constant sheaf  are the same as sheaves of abelian groups in the sense above.

There is a different inverse image functor for sheaves of modules over sheaves of rings. See inverse image functor.

Finiteness conditions for sheaves of modules 

Like for modules, coherence is in general a strictly stronger condition than finite presentation. The Oka coherence theorem states that the sheaf of holomorphic functions on a complex manifold is coherent.

The étalé space of a sheaf 

In the examples above it was noted that some sheaves occur naturally as sheaves of sections. In fact, all sheaves of sets can be represented as sheaves of sections of a topological space called the étalé space, from the French word étalé , meaning roughly "spread out". The space  is usually very strange, and even if the sheaf  arises from a natural topological situation,  may not have any clear topological interpretation. For example, if  is the sheaf of sections of a continuous function , then  if and only if  is a local homeomorphism.

Notice that each stalk has the discrete topology as subspace topology. Two morphisms between sheaves determine a continuous map of the corresponding étalé spaces that is compatible with the projection maps (in the sense that every germ is mapped to a germ over the same point). This makes the construction into a functor.

The construction of an étalé space can also be applied to a presheaf, in which case the sheaf of sections of the étalé space recovers the sheaf associated to the given presheaf.

This construction makes all sheaves into representable functors on certain categories of topological spaces. There is a natural isomorphism,which shows that  (for the étalé space) represents the functor .

 is constructed so that the projection map  is a covering map. In algebraic geometry, the natural analog of a covering map is called an étale morphism. Despite its similarity to "étalé", the word étale  has a different meaning in French. It is possible to turn  into a scheme and  into a morphism of schemes in such a way that  retains the same universal property, but  is not in general an étale morphism because it is not quasi-finite. It is, however, formally étale.

The definition of sheaves by étalé spaces is older than the definition given earlier in the article. It is still common in some areas of mathematics such as mathematical analysis.

Sheaf cohomology 

In contexts where the open set  is fixed, and the sheaf is regarded as a variable, the set  is also often denoted 
As was noted above, this functor does not preserve epimorphisms. A concrete example of this phenomenon is the exponential map 

between the sheaf of holomorphic functions and non-zero holomorphic functions. However,  need not have a logarithm globally.

Sheaf cohomology captures this phenomenon. More precisely, for an exact sequence of sheaves of abelian groups

This method is theoretically satisfactory, but, being based on injective resolutions, of little use in concrete computations. Godement resolutions are another general, but practically inaccessible approach.

Computing sheaf cohomology 
Especially in the context of sheaves on manifolds, sheaf cohomology can often be computed using resolutions by soft sheaves, fine sheaves, and flabby sheaves (also known as flasque sheaves from the French flasque meaning flabby). For example, a partition of unity argument shows that the sheaf of smooth functions on a manifold is soft. The higher cohomology groups  for  vanish for soft sheaves, which gives a way of computing cohomology of other sheaves.

A different approach is by Čech cohomology. Čech cohomology was the first cohomology theory developed for sheaves and it is well-suited to concrete calculations, such as computing the coherent sheaf cohomology of complex projective space . It relates sections on open subsets of the space to cohomology classes on the space. In most cases, Čech cohomology computes the same cohomology groups as the derived functor cohomology. However, for some pathological spaces, Čech cohomology will give the correct  but incorrect higher cohomology groups. To get around this, Jean-Louis Verdier developed hypercoverings. Hypercoverings not only give the correct higher cohomology groups but also allow the open subsets mentioned above to be replaced by certain morphisms from another space. This flexibility is necessary in some applications, such as the construction of Pierre Deligne's mixed Hodge structures.

In this way, the known sheaf cohomology groups on these ambient spaces can be related to the sheaves , giving . For example, computing the coherent sheaf cohomology of projective plane curves is easily found. One big theorem in this space is the Hodge decomposition found using a spectral sequence associated to sheaf cohomology groups, proved by Deligne. Essentially, the -page with termsthe sheaf cohomology of a smooth projective variety , degenerates, meaning . This gives the canonical Hodge structure on the cohomology groups . It was later found these cohomology groups can be easily explicitly computed using Griffiths residues. See Jacobian ideal. These kinds of theorems lead to one of the deepest theorems about the cohomology of algebraic varieties, the decomposition theorem, paving the path for Mixed Hodge modules.

Another clean approach to the computation of some cohomology groups is the Borel–Bott–Weil theorem, which identifies the cohomology groups of some line bundles on flag manifolds with irreducible representations of Lie groups. This theorem can be used, for example, to easily compute the cohomology groups of all line bundles on projective space and grassmann manifolds.

In many cases there is a duality theory for sheaves that generalizes Poincaré duality. See Grothendieck duality and Verdier duality.

Derived categories of sheaves 

 (for ),
where  is the derived functor.

Like , the direct image with compact support  can also be derived. By virtue of the following isomorphism  parametrizes the cohomology with compact support of the fibers of :

This isomorphism is an example of a base change theorem. There is another adjunction

Unlike all the functors considered above, the twisted (or exceptional) inverse image functor  is in general only defined on the level of derived categories, i.e., the functor is not obtained as the derived functor of some functor between abelian categories. If  and X is a smooth orientable manifold of dimension n, then

This computation, and the compatibility of the functors with duality (see Verdier duality) can be used to obtain a high-brow explanation of Poincaré duality. In the context of quasi-coherent sheaves on schemes, there is a similar duality known as coherent duality.

They are an important tool to study the geometry of singularities.

Derived categories of coherent sheaves and the Grothendieck group 
Another important application of derived categories of sheaves is with the derived category of coherent sheaves on a scheme  denoted . This was used by Grothendieck in his development of intersection theory using derived categories and K-theory, that the intersection product of subschemes  is represented in K-theory aswhere  are coherent sheaves defined by the -modules given by their structure sheaves.

Sites and topoi 

André Weil's Weil conjectures stated that there was a cohomology theory for algebraic varieties over finite fields that would give an analogue of the Riemann hypothesis. The cohomology of a complex manifold can be defined as the sheaf cohomology of the locally constant sheaf  in the Euclidean topology, which suggests defining a Weil cohomology theory in positive characteristic as the sheaf cohomology of a constant sheaf. But the only classical topology on such a variety is the Zariski topology, and the Zariski topology has very few open sets, so few that the cohomology of any Zariski-constant sheaf on an irreducible variety vanishes (except in degree zero). Alexandre Grothendieck solved this problem by introducing Grothendieck topologies, which axiomatize the notion of covering. Grothendieck's insight was that the definition of a sheaf depends only on the open sets of a topological space, not on the individual points. Once he had axiomatized the notion of covering, open sets could be replaced by other objects. A presheaf takes each one of these objects to data, just as before, and a sheaf is a presheaf that satisfies the gluing axiom with respect to our new notion of covering. This allowed Grothendieck to define étale cohomology and ℓ-adic cohomology, which eventually were used to prove the Weil conjectures.

A category with a Grothendieck topology is called a site. A category of sheaves on a site is called a topos or a Grothendieck topos. The notion of a topos was later abstracted by William Lawvere and Miles Tierney to define an elementary topos, which has connections to mathematical logic.

History 

The first origins of sheaf theory are hard to pin down – they may be co-extensive with the idea of analytic continuation. It took about 15 years for a recognisable, free-standing theory of sheaves to emerge from the foundational work on cohomology.
 1936 Eduard Čech introduces the nerve construction, for associating a simplicial complex to an open covering.
 1938 Hassler Whitney gives a 'modern' definition of cohomology, summarizing the work since J. W. Alexander and Kolmogorov first defined cochains.
 1943 Norman Steenrod publishes on homology with local coefficients.
 1945 Jean Leray publishes work carried out as a prisoner of war, motivated by proving fixed-point theorems for application to PDE theory; it is the start of sheaf theory and spectral sequences.
 1947 Henri Cartan reproves the de Rham theorem by sheaf methods, in correspondence with André Weil (see De Rham–Weil theorem). Leray gives a sheaf definition in his courses via closed sets (the later carapaces).
 1948 The Cartan seminar writes up sheaf theory for the first time.
 1950 The "second edition" sheaf theory from the Cartan seminar: the sheaf space (espace étalé) definition is used, with stalkwise structure. Supports are introduced, and cohomology with supports. Continuous mappings give rise to spectral sequences. At the same time Kiyoshi Oka introduces an idea (adjacent to that) of a sheaf of ideals, in several complex variables.
 1951 The Cartan seminar proves theorems A and B, based on Oka's work.
 1953 The finiteness theorem for coherent sheaves in the analytic theory is proved by Cartan and Jean-Pierre Serre, as is Serre duality.
 1954 Serre's paper Faisceaux algébriques cohérents (published in 1955) introduces sheaves into algebraic geometry. These ideas are immediately exploited by Friedrich Hirzebruch, who writes a major 1956 book on topological methods.
 1955 Alexander Grothendieck in lectures in Kansas defines abelian category and presheaf, and by using injective resolutions allows direct use of sheaf cohomology on all topological spaces, as derived functors.
 1956 Oscar Zariski's report Algebraic sheaf theory
 1957 Grothendieck's Tohoku paper rewrites homological algebra; he proves Grothendieck duality (i.e., Serre duality for possibly singular algebraic varieties).
 1957 onwards: Grothendieck extends sheaf theory in line with the needs of algebraic geometry, introducing: schemes and general sheaves on them, local cohomology, derived categories (with Verdier), and Grothendieck topologies. There emerges also his influential schematic idea of 'six operations' in homological algebra.
 1958 Roger Godement's book on sheaf theory is published. At around this time Mikio Sato proposes his hyperfunctions, which will turn out to have sheaf-theoretic nature.

At this point sheaves had become a mainstream part of mathematics, with use by no means restricted to algebraic topology. It was later discovered that the logic in categories of sheaves is intuitionistic logic (this observation is now often referred to as Kripke–Joyal semantics, but probably should be attributed to a number of authors).

See also 
 Coherent sheaf
 Gerbe
 Stack (mathematics)
 Sheaf of spectra
 Perverse sheaf
 Presheaf of spaces
 Constructible sheaf
 De Rham's theorem

Notes

References 
  (oriented towards conventional topological applications)
 
 
 
  (updated edition of a classic using enough sheaf theory to show its power)
 
  (advanced techniques such as the derived category and vanishing cycles on the most reasonable spaces)
  (category theory and toposes emphasised)
 
 
 
 
  (concise lecture notes)
  (pedagogic treatment)
  (introductory book with open access)

Topological methods of algebraic geometry
Algebraic topology